Nevil Hall (19 October 1915 – 9 July 1987) was a South African wrestler. He competed in the men's freestyle featherweight at the 1936 Summer Olympics.

References

1915 births
1987 deaths
South African male sport wrestlers
Olympic wrestlers of South Africa
Wrestlers at the 1936 Summer Olympics
Sportspeople from Cape Town